Volodymyr Brazhnyk (27 September 1924 – 29 January 1999) was a Ukrainian athlete. He competed in the men's pole vault at the 1952 Summer Olympics, representing the Soviet Union.

References

1924 births
1999 deaths
Athletes (track and field) at the 1952 Summer Olympics
Soviet male pole vaulters
Ukrainian male pole vaulters
Olympic athletes of the Soviet Union
National University of Ukraine on Physical Education and Sport alumni
Place of birth missing